The master list of Nixon political opponents was a secret list compiled by President Richard Nixon's Presidential Counselor Charles Colson. It was an expansion of the original Nixon's Enemies List of 20 key people considered opponents of President Richard Nixon. In total, the expanded list contained 220 people or organizations.

The master list was compiled in mid-1971 in Charles Colson's office and sent in memorandum form to John Dean. On June 27, 1973, Dean provided to the Senate Watergate Committee this updated "master list" of political opponents. The original list had multiple sections, including a section for "Black Congressmen".

The purpose of the list was to "use the available Federal machinery to screw [their] political enemies." One such scheme involved using the Internal Revenue Service to harass people on the list.

Response
Carol Channing stated that inclusion on the list was her greatest accomplishment.  Talk show host and journalist Lou Gordon, who was also on the list, considered his inclusion to be a "badge of honor".

Likewise, Tony Randall found it something he was extremely proud of, according to Jack Klugman in his memoir on Randall.

In The Great Shark Hunt (1979), Hunter S. Thompson expressed disappointment in not having been included on the list, writing "I would almost have preferred a vindictive tax audit to that kind of crippling exclusion."

Carl Djerassi's 1992 autobiography The Pill, Pigmy Chimps, and Degas' Horse stated that President Nixon awarded him the National Medal of Science when he was on the Enemies List. Djerassi attributed his inclusion to the fact that he was an opponent of the 
Vietnam War.

Entries

Senators

Members of the House of Representatives

Black Congressmen and Congresswomen

Other politicians

Organizations

Labor

Media

Celebrities

Business people

Business additions

Business

Academics

Notes

References

External links 
Records of the Watergate Special Prosecution Force 1971 to 1977 via National Archives and Records Administration

Watergate scandal